Willis Charles Patterson (born November 27, 1930) is an American bass-baritone, editor, music arranger, and professor emeritus/longtime Associate Dean of the University of Michigan School of Music, Theatre & Dance. A Fulbright Scholar and the winner of the Marian Anderson Award, he has performed in opera houses and concert halls internationally. He has served as president of the National Association of Negro Musicians and as executive secretary of the National Black Music Caucus. In 1977 he edited what The New York Times described as a "groundbreaking anthology of black art songs."

Life and career
Born in Ann Arbor, Michigan, Patterson was the son of Ed Curtis. He grew up in a poor family in the Northern part of Ann Arbor. His biological parents were not married, and he was raised by his mother and step-father. His step-father hauled coal for a living and struggled with alcoholism. He had nine siblings on the Patterson side of the family whom he lived with, in addition to 10 other siblings from his biological father. Willis  is a graduate of Ann Arbor High School, the University of Michigan (BM in 1958 and MM in 1959), and Wayne State University (Doctorate of Music). A Fulbright Scholarship enabled him to pursue studies in opera and lieder in Germany for a year and a half, and he also attended classes in opera at the Manhattan School of Music. Prior to joining the voice faculty at the University of Michigan in 1968, Willis served on the music faculties of Virginia State College and Southern University. From 1969–1975 he was the music director of the University of Michigan Men's Glee Club.

Selected publications and recordings 

 The New Negro Spiritual Collection (2002)
 The Unlikely Saga of a Singer from Ann Arbor (2015)
 Art Songs by Black American Composers (1981)
 The Second Anthology of Art Songs by African American Composers (2002)
 Spirituals (1991)
 Amazing Grace (1991)

References

1930 births
American opera singers
American bass-baritones
University of Michigan School of Music, Theatre & Dance alumni
University of Michigan faculty
Living people
Wayne State University alumni
Musicians from Ann Arbor, Michigan
Southern University faculty
Virginia State University faculty